A Pierrette is, in the theatre, a female Pierrot

Pierrette may also refer to:
Marie-Anne Pierrette Paulze (1758–1836), French chemist, and wife of Antoine Lavoisier
Olga Bancic (1912–1944), Jewish–Romanian activist in the French Resistance 
Paul and Pierrette Girault de Coursac, two French historians who specialise in the life of Louis XVI and Marie-Antoinette
Pierrette Le Pen (born 1935), ex-wife of Jean-Marie Le Pen and mother of Marine Le Pen
Pierrette Adams (born 1962), singer from the Republic of the Congo
Pierrette Alarie, CC, CQ (1921–2011), French Canadian coloratura soprano
Pierrette Ringuette (born 1955), Canadian Senator
Pierrette Venne (born 1945), member of the Canadian House of Commons from 1988 to 2003
Pierrette-Henriette Clostermann, a.k.a. Perrine H. Clostermann, a character from the anime/manga franchise Strike Witches

See also
Les Noces de Pierrette, 1905 painting by Spanish artist Pablo Picasso

French feminine given names